Robert McCann may refer to:
 Bob McCann, American basketball player
 Robert J. McCann, American businessman
 Robert McCann (mathematician)
 Bert McCann (Robert Johnston McCann), Scottish footballer